Andrew MacDonald may refer to:

Andrew MacDonald (ice hockey) (born 1986), Canadian professional ice hockey defenceman
Andrew Macdonald (producer) (born 1966), Scottish film producer
Duck MacDonald (born 1953), real name Andrew MacDonald, American rock guitarist
Andrew Archibald Macdonald (1829–1912), Canadian politician
Andrew Paul MacDonald (born 1958), Canadian composer
Andrew Macdonald (poet) (1757–1790), Scottish poet
Andy Macdonald (skateboarder) (born 1973), American professional skateboarder
Andy MacDonald (American football) (1930–1985), American football player and coach
Andrew MacDonald (rugby union) (born 1966), Scottish rugby union international
Andrew Macdonald, pseudonym of William Luther Pierce (1933–2002), American leader of the white separatist National Alliance organization and author of The Turner Diaries

See also
Andrew McDonald (disambiguation)